The Centre de services scolaire des Draveurs is one of 4 public Francophone school service centres operating in the Outaouais region, Quebec. The school board was created in 1986 in the old city of Gatineau about 15 years before amalgamation. Its current president is Christine Emond-Lapointe, a former Bloc Québécois candidate for the riding of Pontiac in the 2006 Canadian federal elections. The general manager is Francois Jette.

The board operates 24 primary schools across the Gatineau sector as well as in Cantley and Val-des-Monts. However, it recent years, they have closed certain primary schools due to lower yearly attendance at those schools.

The board also operates 4 high schools : Polyvalente de l'Érablière, Polyvalente Nicolas-Gatineau, Polyvalente Le Carrefour and École secondaire du Versant and offers transportation to students attending Collège Saint-Joseph de Hull and Collège Saint-Alexandre, the city's two private schools.

It also operates professional and adult formation centres including the Centre de Competence Outaouais and the L'Escale and Nouvelle-Horizon center for adults.

Several councillors of the City of Gatineau were formally or are school trustees at the CSD. Among those included Aurèle Desjardins, Joseph de Sylva, Paul Morin and Luc Angers.

Its motto is : Decouvrir, Grandir, Devenir (Discover, Grow and Become)

Primary schools

Source:
 École Carle
 École de l'Envolée
 École de l'Escalade
 École de l'Odyssée (Jean XXIII & St-René Goupil)
 École de la Colline (Val-des-Monts)
 École de la Montée
 École de la Rose-des-Vents (Cantley)
 École de la Traversée (Lavigne & Ste-Maria Goretti)
 École de Touraine (George-Étienne Cartier & Riviera)
 École des Belles-Rives (Sainte-Rose)
 École des Cépages
 École des Trois-Saisons
 École du Bois-Joli
 École du Nouveau-Monde (Renaud & Saint-Rosaire)
 École du Vallon
 École L'Équipage (Val-des-Monts)
 École L'Oiseau Bleu
 École La Sablonnière
 École La Source
 École Le Petit Prince
 École Le Tremplin (Le Coteau)
 École Massé
 École Raymond
 École Sainte-Élizabeth

References

External links
 Website of the CSSD school board

School districts in Quebec
Education in Gatineau